Lynne S. Warm-Griffiths (July 26, 1923 – August 22, 1990), of New Orleans, New York City, and California, was a philatelist who created award-winning collections and helped stamp collecting by participating actively in various philatelic organizations.

Collecting interests
Her philatelic collections were specialized and included collections of United States postage stamps used overseas between 1894 and 1904, United States Newspaper stamps, Periodical stamps and First Bureau Issues. Her collections won awards at major stamp exhibitions.

Philatelic activity
Lynne S. Warm-Griffiths was very active within the philatelic community, serving in a number of posts at the Crescent City Stamp Club in New Orleans, at the Collectors Club of New York, and at the Federated Philatelic Clubs of Southern California. In addition, Lynne was active within the American Philatelic Society and at the Philatelic Foundation.

Honors and awards
Warm-Griffiths was named to the American Philatelic Society Hall of Fame in 1991.

See also
 Philately

References
 Lynne S. Warm-Griffiths

1923 births
1990 deaths
American philatelists
People from New Orleans
American Philatelic Society
People from New York City
People from California
Women philatelists